Clark Waddoups (born April 21, 1946) is a senior United States district judge of the United States District Court for the District of Utah.

Education and legal career 
Waddoups received his Bachelor of Arts degree from Brigham Young University in 1970 and his Juris Doctor from the S.J. Quinney College of Law at the University of Utah in 1973. He was most recently a partner in the law firm of Parr, Waddoups, Brown, Gee & Loveless where he was a trial lawyer specializing in commercial litigation, including antitrust, securities, labor/employment, banking, construction, environmental and insurance claims. Waddoups has represented clients in industries such as heavy manufacturing, broadcasting, banking and finance, automotive, oil, and real estate.

Community and professional involvement 
Waddoups practiced for O'Melveny & Myers, a large California law firm for seven years in Los Angeles before joining Parr Waddoups in 1981. Prior to that, he served as a law clerk for Judge J. Clifford Wallace of the United States Court of Appeals for the Ninth Circuit, from 1973 to 1974.

Prior to his appointment, Judge Waddoups, who is admitted to practice in California and before all state and federal courts in Utah, was a registered lobbyist in the State of Utah, an active member of the Utah Supreme Court Advisory Committee on the Rules of Evidence, and past President of the A. Sherman Christensen American Inn of Court.

Federal judicial service
Waddoups was nominated by President George W. Bush on April 29, 2008. He was confirmed by the Senate on September 26, 2008. He received his commission on October 21, 2008. He assumed senior status on January 31, 2019.

Tenure as federal judge 
Waddoups has been the presiding judge in over 600 cases since his confirmation in 2008, involving contract, real property, torts, civil rights, labor, bankruptcy, intellectual property, social security, and more.

Notable rulings and selected opinions

Kody Brown, et al. v. Gary Herbert, Governor of Utah, et al.
On July 13, 2011, Kody Brown and family, from the TLC reality television show Sister Wives, filed a complaint in the United States 10th District Court, District of Utah, to challenge Utah's polygamy laws. Jonathan Turley of George Washington University represented the plaintiffs in the case. The plaintiffs were found to have legal standing, though no charges have been filed against them.  On December 13, 2013, approximately eleven months after he heard oral arguments in the case, Judge Waddoups rendered a 91-page decision striking down the cohabitation clause of Utah's polygamy statute as unconstitutional, but also allowing Utah to maintain its ban on multiple marriage licenses. Unlawful cohabitation, where prosecutors did not need to prove that a marriage ceremony had taken place (only that a couple had lived together), had been a major tool used to prosecute polygamy in Utah since the 1882 Edmunds Act.

HB 497
Judge Waddoups blocked an immigration law signed by Gov. Gary Herbert in March 2011 that would require police to check citizenship status upon arrest. According to ABC News, Waddoups "issued his ruling in Salt Lake City just 14 hours after the law went into effect, saying that there is sufficient evidence that at least some portions of the Utah legislation will be found unconstitutional.

United States v. John and Susan Ross
In December of 2009, Judge Waddoups sentenced two Davis School District employees, John and Susan Ross, for money laundering and fraud. The couple pleaded guilty and received 36 months probation, 3,000 hours of community service, $10,000 in fines, and $350,000 in restitution. Waddoups issued no jail time, against the prosecutors request, causing some to ask whether the judge was "going easy" on white-collar crimes.

Fitisemanu v. United States 
In December 2019, Waddoups ruled that Samoans should be recognized as U.S. citizens. This decision was later reversed by the United States Court of Appeals for the Tenth Circuit and is pending certiorari before the Supreme Court of the United States.

References

External links
District court web page
Resume

1946 births
Living people
Brigham Young University alumni
Judges of the United States District Court for the District of Utah
People from Butte County, Idaho
United States district court judges appointed by George W. Bush
University of Utah alumni